Sulfiq.L is a playback singer as well as a director. He has sung Tamil and Malayalam language songs for feature films and has also performed and directed many music videos.

Sulfiq was noticed by film industry only after his Dubai based music videos and was introduced as playback singer in the bi-lingual Sand City directed by actor Shankar. Album 'Dubai Days', released on UAE National day, sung by Sulfiq was a YouTube success.

The title song 'Aakaasha Kuda' from Oru Mexican Aparatha (2017) has made Sulfiq a noticeable singer of Malayalam films. He has also launched a YouTube channel called Sound Clef for talented singers waiting for opportunities.

Personal life

Sulfiq, born in Alappuzha, Kerala is working as infrastructure & utility manager at Afcons LLC for road transport authority project, Dubai.

List of Songs

References

External links
 

1972 births
Living people
Singers from Kerala
Indian male playback singers
Film musicians from Kerala
Malayalam playback singers
Tamil playback singers
21st-century Indian singers
Musicians from Alappuzha
21st-century Indian male singers